Kian is the English variant of the Gaelic Irish given name Cian, meaning "ancient". A variant spelling of Kian is Kyan.

Kian (Persian: کیان) is also a common Persian given name meaning "king" or "realm".  Its Persian origin is pronounced as ( / kee-ahn) whose closest spelling in English is Keon.

People named Kian include:

 Kian (musician) (born Kian Brownfield in 2002), Australian singer/songwriter
 Kian Andersen (born 1991), Danish badminton player
 Kian Duncan, English footballer
 Kian Egan (born 1980), Irish singer
 Kian Emadi-Coffin (born 1992), British cyclist
 Kian Fitz-Jim (born 2003), Dutch footballer
 Kian Hansen (born 1989), Danish football player
 Kian Harratt (born 2002), English footballer
 Kian Kazemi (born 1986), Iranian-Filipino actor
 Kian Rosenberg Larsson (born 1992), Danish rapper
 Kian Lawley (born 1995), American YouTuber and actor
 Kian Pemberton, West Indian cricketer
 Kian Pirfalak (c. 2013–2022), nine-year-old killed by Iranian security forces
 Kian Ronan (born 2001), Gibraltarian footballer
 Kian Scales (born 2002), English footballer
 Kian Slor (born 2002), Dutch footballer
 Kian Soltani (born 1992), Austrian cellist

See also 
 
 
 Cian a figure in Irish mythology
 Kayanian dynasty
 Kian (disambiguation)

References 

English masculine given names
Irish masculine given names
Persian masculine given names